The Diocese of the South is a diocese of the Orthodox Church in America (OCA).  Its territory includes parishes, monasteries, and missions located in fourteen states in the Southern and Southwestern United States – Alabama, Arkansas, Florida, Georgia, Kentucky, Louisiana, Mississippi, New Mexico, North Carolina, Oklahoma, South Carolina, Tennessee, Texas, and Virginia.

The diocesan chancery is located in Dallas, Texas. The Diocese's episcopal seat is Saint Seraphim Cathedral (Dallas, Texas) with Christ the Saviour Cathedral (Miami Lakes, Florida) as a co-cathedral.

Archbishop Dmitri Royster was the first and only ruling bishop of the Diocese of the South from 1978 until his retirement on March 31, 2009.  Archbishop Nikon of Boston, New England, and the Albanian Archdiocese initially served as locum tenens. As of March 21, 2015, Metropolitan Tikhon Archbishop of Washington, Metropolitan of All American and Canada served as locum tenens with Bishop Gerasim (Eliel) of Ft. Worth as the Diocesan Administrator. As of March 29, 2016, Bishop Alexander (Golitzin) current ruling bishop of the Bulgarian Diocese, has been elected by the Holy Synod to be the ruling bishop of the Diocese of the South, in addition to his current diocese.

Deaneries 

The diocese is grouped geographically into six deaneries, each consisting of a number of parishes.  Each deanery is headed by a parish priest, known as a dean.  The deans coordinate activities in their area's parishes, and report to the diocesan bishop.  The current deaneries of the Diocese of the South and their territories are:

 Appalachian Deanery – Kentucky, Tennessee, and Virginia
 Carolina Deanery – North Carolina and South Carolina
 Central Florida Deanery – Florida
 Southcentral Deanery – Arkansas, Louisiana, Mississippi, New Mexico, Oklahoma, and Texas
 Southeastern Deanery – Alabama and Georgia, 
 South Florida Deanery – Florida

External links
 Official site

References

Religious organizations established in the 1970s
South
Eastern Orthodoxy in the United States
Eastern Orthodoxy in Alabama
Eastern Orthodoxy in Arkansas
Eastern Orthodoxy in Florida
Christianity in Georgia (U.S. state)
Christianity in Kentucky
Christianity in Louisiana
Christianity in Mississippi
Christianity in New Mexico
Christianity in North Carolina
Christianity in Oklahoma
Christianity in South Carolina
Christianity in Tennessee
Eastern Orthodoxy in Texas
Christianity in Virginia
Religion in the Southern United States